South Side Baptist Church is a historic Southern Baptist church at 2400 Dodson Avenue in Fort Smith, Arkansas.  It is a large two-story brick building, built in 1948 with Moderne styling.  The main facade is symmetrically arranged, with its entrances recessed to the sides of a round Romanesque arch, whose rear wall presents a round-arch window.  Narrow windows and projecting corner sections relieve the mass of brickwork, with the corner sections providing vertical emphasis with piers and rising the height of the building.  The building is a rare local example of the Moderne style. It is used by the church for educational facilities.

The building was listed on the National Register of Historic Places in 2006.

See also
National Register of Historic Places in Sebastian County, Arkansas

References

External links
South Side Baptist Church web site

Baptist churches in Arkansas
Churches on the National Register of Historic Places in Arkansas
Streamline Moderne architecture in the United States
Churches completed in 1948
Churches in Sebastian County, Arkansas
Buildings and structures in Fort Smith, Arkansas
National Register of Historic Places in Sebastian County, Arkansas
Southern Baptist Convention churches